Lees-Milne is a surname. Notable people include:
Alvilde Lees-Milne (née Bridges; formerly Viscountess Chaplin) (1909–1994), British gardening and landscape expert
James Lees-Milne (1908–1997), English writer and expert on country houses

See also
Lees (surname)
Milne (surname)

Compound surnames
English-language surnames
Surnames of English origin